USS Preston (DD–19) was a  in the United States Navy during World War I. She was the third ship named for Samuel W. Preston.

Construction
Preston was laid down on 28 April 1908 by the New York Shipbuilding Company, Camden, New Jersey, launched on 14 July 1909, sponsored by Miss Katherine Magoun, and commissioned on 21 December 1909, Lieutenant commander George C. Day in command.

World War I
Preston, attached to Destroyer Force, Atlantic Fleet, conducted peacetime patrols and participated in various individual, squadron, and fleet exercises until assigned to neutrality duties prior to the entry of the United States into World War I. At New York on 6 April 1917, she sailed within the week for Boston, Massachusetts, where she continued patrol duties until 12 May. Then reassigned to Destroyer Force, Atlantic, she performed coastal escort and patrol duties for two months. In July, she sailed east, and from 1 August to 5 October she patrolled and performed escort work off the strategically located Azores. Next ordered to Brest, she conducted similar missions along the French coast until the Armistice. On 11 December 1918, she sailed for the United States, arriving at Charleston, South Carolina on 4 January 1919.

Later shifted to Philadelphia, Pennsylvania, she decommissioned on 17 July and her name was struck from the Naval Vessel Register on 15 September. On 21 November, the coal burning "Flivver" was sold to the T. A. Scott Company of New London, Connecticut.

Noteworthy commanding officers
 Lieutenant commander George C. Day (21 December 1909 – 1910) (Later Rear admiral)
 Lieutenant Herbert F. Leary (1912-Unknown) (Later Vice admiral)

References

External links

 NavSource Photos

 

Smith-class destroyers
World War I destroyers of the United States
Ships built by New York Shipbuilding Corporation
1909 ships